Ilya Kondratyev (born 27 March 1990) is a Russian rower. He competed in the 2020 Summer Olympics.

References

1990 births
Living people
Sportspeople from Kaluga
Rowers at the 2020 Summer Olympics
Russian male rowers
Olympic rowers of Russia